Eichelberger is the surname of:
 Alyce Eichelberger or Alyce Cleese (born 1944), American psychotherapist and author
 Charles B. Eichelberger, US Army general
 Dave Eichelberger, American golfer
 Ethyl Eichelberger, American actor
 John Eichelberger, American politician
 Juan Eichelberger, American baseball player
 Robert L. Eichelberger, US Army general of World War II

See also
 Eichelberger's Covered Bridge (disambiguation)